RPT Realty, formerly known as RAMCO Properties Trust and  Ramco-Gershenson Properties Trust, is a publicly traded real estate investment trust that owns and operates open-air shopping centers. As of August 4, 2021, the company owned 50 shopping centers comprising 12.6 million square feet.

Notable properties owned by the company include The Shops on Lane Avenue in Upper Arlington, Ohio; Woodbury Lakes in Woodbury, Minnesota; Bedford Marketplace in Bedford, Massachusetts; Lakehills Plaza in Austin, Texas; River City Marketplace in Jacksonville, Florida; Mission Bay Plaza in Boca Raton, Florida; The Crossroads in Royal Palm Beach, Florida; Coral Creek Shops in Coconut Creek, Florida.

History
In 1955, Aaron & William Gershenson founded A & W Management Company.

In 1975, William Gershenson's four sons, Joel, Dennis, Richard and Bruce Alan, along with associate Mike Ward, took over leadership of the company, with each son responsible for a different division. 
In the late 1970s and early 1980s, the company developed 35 Kmart stores.

In 1996, the company merged with RPS Realty Trust and became a public company via a reverse merger, changing its name to Ramco-Gershenson Properties Trust.

In 2004, the company acquired 7 properties for $138.3 million.

In 2017, the company was added to the S&P 600.

On May 2, 2018, the company changed its name to RAMCO.

On October 31, 2018, the company changed its name to RPT Realty.

References

External links

1950 establishments in Michigan
Companies based in Oakland County, Michigan
Companies listed on the New York Stock Exchange
Real estate companies established in 1950
Real estate investment trusts of the United States
Shopping center management firms